Dakota City is a city in Dakota County, Nebraska, United States. The population was 1,919 at the 2010 census. It is the county seat of Dakota County. Tyson Foods' largest beef production plant is located in Dakota City.

History
Dakota City was platted in 1856. It was named for the Dakota people. Dakota City was incorporated as a city in 1858.

Emmanuel Lutheran Church in Dakota City is listed on the National Register of Historic Places.

On May 1, 2020, 669 workers at the local Tyson Foods meat packaging plant were infected with COVID-19 which resulted in the closure of the plant until May 4 for the sanitation to take place.

Geography
Dakota City is located at  (42.415294, -96.417808).

Demographics

Dakota City is part of the Sioux City, IA–NE–SD Metropolitan Statistical Area.

2010 census
As of the census of 2010, there were 1,919 people, 637 households, and 464 families residing in the city. The racial makeup of the city was 82.4% White, 0.8% African American, 1.9% Native American, 4.5% Asian, 8.3% from other races, and 2.1% from two or more races. Hispanic or Latino of any race were 29.3% of the population.

There were 637 households, of which 41.0% had children under the age of 18 living with them, 55.9% were married couples living together, 11.8% had a female householder with no husband present, 5.2% had a male householder with no wife present, and 27.2% were non-families. 20.4% of all households were made up of individuals, and 6% had someone living alone who was 65 years of age or older. The average household size was 2.90 and the average family size was 3.37.

The median age in the city was 34.6 years. 29.3% of residents were under the age of 18; 7.9% were between the ages of 18 and 24; 28.9% were from 25 to 44; 24.2% were from 45 to 64; and 9.8% were 65 years of age or older. The gender makeup of the city was 51.1% male and 48.9% female.

2000 census
As of the census of 2000, there were 1,821 people, 596 households, and 448 families residing in the city. The racial makeup of the city was 84.62% White, 0.77% African American, 1.81% Native American, 1.92% Asian, 9.28% from other races, and 1.59% from two or more races. Hispanic or Latino of any race were 20.21% of the population.

There were 596 households, out of which 42.6% had children under the age of 18 living with them, 60.7% were married couples living together, 10.7% had a female householder with no husband present, and 24.8% were non-families. 18.8% of all households were made up of individuals, and 5.7% had someone living alone who was 65 years of age or older. The average household size was 2.99 and the average family size was 3.38.

In the city, the population was spread out, with 31.1% under the age of 18, 9.5% from 18 to 24, 31.1% from 25 to 44, 20.4% from 45 to 64, and 7.9% who were 65 years of age or older. The median age was 31 years. For every 100 females, there were 104.6 males. For every 100 females age 18 and over, there were 106.8 males.

As of 2000 the median income for a household in the city was $43,438, and the median income for a family was $45,987. Males had a median income of $30,612 versus $24,150 for females. The per capita income for the city was $16,923. About 7.0% of families and 8.1% of the population were below the poverty line, including 10.7% of those under age 18 and 7.2% of those age 65 or over.

Notable people

 Ralph F. Beermann - Member of the United States House of Representatives from Nebraska
 James Young Deer - Silent-era American Indian director and actor.

See also
Impact of the 2019–20 coronavirus pandemic on the meat industry in the United States

References

External links
 City website

Cities in Nebraska
Cities in Dakota County, Nebraska
County seats in Nebraska
Sioux City metropolitan area
Nebraska populated places on the Missouri River